The Wait of Glory is the third album from Proto-Kaw after their retrospective initial release and debut recording Before Became After.

Drumming honors have passed from Brad Schulz to newcomer Mike Patrum. The other newcomer is Jake Livgren on lead and background vocals, alto saxophone, and percussion. Livgren has been with the band since its re-inception, but is officially credited as a member on this album.

The Special Edition release includes the primary eleven tracks, plus a bonus studio track and a DVD with songs from the bands July, 2005 Nearfest Progressive Rock Festival performance.

The album was recorded at:
Grandyzine Recording Company - Berryton, Kansas (Engineer Kerry Livgren)

Track listing
"Nevermore"  – 9:17
"Relics of the Tempest"  – 5:07
"When the Rains Come"  – 8:56
"On the Eve of the Great Decline"  – 4:51
"Physic"  – 5:45
"At Morning's Gate"  – 3:11
"Melicus Gladiator"  – 4:52
"The Vigil"  – 7:20
"Old Number 63 (Is What It Always Was)"  – 6:51
"Osvaldo's Groceries"  – 3:17
"Picture This"  – 6:42
bonus studio track (available with special edition):
"One Fine Day"  – 4:32
Disc 2 (available with special edition): DVD of July 2005 performance at Progressive Legends Rock Festival
"The Occasion of Your Honest Dreaming"  – 6:12
"Words of Honour"  – 4:40
"Skont"  – 8:01

All songs written by Kerry Livgren

Musicians

Band members
Lynn Meredith – vocals, Narration
John Bolton – saxophones, Flute
Kerry Livgren – guitars, Piano, keyboards, percussion, Background Vocals
Dan Wright – Organ, Keyboards, Percussion, Background Vocals
Craig Kew – bass, Background Vocals
Mike Patrum – drums
Jake Livgren – Guitar, Alto Saxophone, Keyboards, Percussion, Backing Vocals, Lead Vocals (on Melicus Gladiator)

Guest musicians
Daryl Batchelor – Trumpet, Flugelhorn

Others
Ken Westphal – Cover art

Release details
2006, USA, InsideOut Music SPV48772, Release date 31 January 2006, CD
2006, USA, InsideOut Music SPV48770, Release date 31 January 2006, CD special edition

References

Proto-Kaw albums
2006 albums